Jan Moretus, also John Moerentorf or Joannes Moretus (2 May 1543 – 22 September 1610), was a Flemish printer who was an apprentice for Christophe Plantin, married his daughter, and later inherited the printing business on his father-in-law's death.

Biography
Moretus was born in Antwerp, the son of satin-weaver Jacob Mourentorf and Adriana Gras, daughter of Pieter Gras, a silk-weaver from Milan. He began working for publisher Christophe Plantin in 1557, when he was 14 years of age. He worked in Venice, starting around 1562 to 1563, and then returned to Plantin's business in Antwerp by 1565. In 1570, he married Martina Plantin, the second daughter of the publisher. Christophe wrote a letter on 5 November 1570 to Gabriel de Çayas (secretary to Philip II of Spain) about his new son-in-law:

After Christophe Plantin's death, Jan Moretus became the owner of the Plantin Press printing company. Under his management, the company focused on 12mo format for text books, doing away with the smaller handbook (enchiridion) favored under his predecessor.

His wife, considered a formidable businesswoman from the wealthy bourgeoisie, ran Plantin Press from 1610 to 1614. Plantin, through her marriage to Moretus, was considered to be the head of the printing dynasty that lasted for more than three centuries. Her sons, Balthasar and Jan, inherited the printing business and bookshop.

Projects 
Some of the notable projects published by Moretus include Benito Arias Montano's Anima, an eight-book series detailing the history of humanity from the Creation through its regeneration with Christ's birth. He has also collaborated with theologians in the publication of religious texts. For example, he worked with the Flemish scholar Henricus Sedulius during the publication of Bonaventure's The Life of St. Francis (De vita s. patris Francisci).

Moretus' works and archives are held in the Plantin-Moretus Museum in Antwerp.

References

People from Antwerp
Flemish printers
1543 births
1610 deaths
16th-century printers
17th-century printers
Book publishers (people) of the Spanish Netherlands